"We Should Be Friends" is a song written and recorded by American country music artist Miranda Lambert. It was released to radio on December 12, 2016, as the second single from Lambert's sixth studio album The Weight of These Wings (2016).

Music video
The music video was directed by Trey Fanjoy and premiered on February 9, 2017. In it, Lambert is shown in a beauty salon getting a makeover and interacting with other patrons (which include songwriters Natalie Hemby and Waylon Payne) who are getting their hair curled with beer cans and gossiping. The video was filmed in Watertown, Tennessee and draws conceptual similarities to Legally Blonde.

Charts

Weekly charts

Year-end charts

References

2016 songs
2016 singles
Miranda Lambert songs
RCA Records Nashville singles
Songs written by Miranda Lambert
Song recordings produced by Frank Liddell
Music videos directed by Trey Fanjoy